Diego Kostner (born August 5, 1992) is an Italian professional ice hockey Winger who is currently playing for HC Ambrì-Piotta of the Swiss National League (NL).

Playing career
He previously played as a youth and his first five professional years with fellow Swiss club, HC Lugano of the NLA. On February 15, 2016, Kostner agreed to a two-year deal with HC Ambrì-Piotta beginning in the 2016–17 season.

International play
Kostner was named to the Italy national ice hockey team for competition at the 2014 IIHF World Championship.

Career statistics

Regular season and playoffs

International

References

External links

1992 births
Living people
HC Ambrì-Piotta players
HC Lugano players
Italian ice hockey right wingers
Sportspeople from Brixen